Ayodhya is a 2005 Tamil-language drama film written, produced and directed by R. Jayaprakash. The film stars newcomer Mohankumar, Ramana, Rekha Unnikrishnan and newcomer Ragini Nandwani, with Manivannan, J. Livingston, Charan Raj, Saranya Ponvannan, Seetha, Ilavarasu, Mayilsamy, Chitti Babu and Delhi Kumar playing supporting roles. It was released on 28 January 2005.

Plot

Hussain Bhai (J. Livingston) and Sundaram Pillai (Charan Raj) were best friends in Ayodhyapuri near Nagercoil, a place where Hindus and Muslims lived in harmony. Hussain and Sundaram bought land to build a factory at that place. Hussain was married to Jameela (Saranya Ponvannan), while Sundaram married Seetha (Seetha) under Hussain and Jameela's blessings. Jameela and Seetha then became pregnant. Jameela, who had suffered a miscarriage, feared to lose her baby. In the meantime, Sabapathy (Manivannan), who was a troublemaker, turned the friends into enemies for his own personal gain. This issue was taken by the villagers, and the village split into two with Muslims on one side and Hindus on the other side. Later, Seetha and Jameela gave birth in the same hospital the same day. Fearing that Jameela's baby may die, Seetha switched the babies in their cradles, but Jameela knew about it.

25 years later, the conflict intensified between Hussain and Sundaram, and they are in a legal fight over the factory with Sabapathy, continuing to add fuel to the conflict. Seetha and Jameela want their husbands to make peace. Hussain's son grows up as Shankar (Ramana) in Sundaram's house, whereas Sundaram's son grows up as Ameer (Mohankumar) in Hussain's house. Ameer falls in love with Shankar's cousin Anu (Rekha Unnikrishnan), while Shankar falls in love with Ameer's relative Zarina (Ragini Nandwani). Thereafter, Ameer and Shankar become friends and decide to support their love. Sabapathy, who pulled strings to create conflicts between Muslims and Hindus, is ultimately killed. The film ends with Hussain and Sundaram making up after their quarrel, the lovers brought together, and Muslims and Hindus making peace.

Cast

Mohankumar as Ameer
Ramana as Shankar
Rekha Unnikrishnan as Anu
Ragini Nandwani as Zarina
Manivannan as Sabapathy 
J. Livingston as Hussain Bhai
Charan Raj as Sundaram Pillai
Saranya Ponvannan as Jameela
Seetha as Seetha
Ilavarasu as Vaiyapuri
Mayilsamy as Guna
Chitti Babu as Akbar
Delhi Kumar as Jamal Bhai
 Bava Lakshmanan  as Thevar
Swaminathan
Thamizhselvan
Amutha Ganesan
Sampathraj
Sathya
Besant Nagar Shankar
Abhinayashree in a special appearance

Production
Director R. Jayaprakash explained, "The title is suggestive of the trouble that takes place in the story. Ayodhya is a holy place and for those living in the village, there is no controversy or the location of the temple. For the outsiders only the trouble. All the unrest in this town is due to outsiders. So is the case with the village and the two lovebirds". Newcomer Mohankumar, Ramana, Rekha Unnikrishnan, and newcomer Ragini Nandwani signed to play the lead roles. Sabesh–Murali had scored music for the film, and two of the songs were shot in Ireland.

Soundtrack

The soundtrack was composed by the duo Sabesh–Murali, with lyrics written by Na. Muthukumar, P. Vijay and Kalaikumar.

Reception
Balaji Balasubramaniam of bbthots.com wrote, "Ayodhya's only link to religion is that it features two Hindu-Muslim romances. But the director has complicated the romances so much that even he is unable to close things off cleanly" and added, "Mohankumar lacks the talent, looks, physique and voice to be a leading man [...] Ramanaa fares better compared to him". Sify said, "Even though Jayaprakash sets out to make a movie on Hindu-Muslim amity to spread communal harmony, he ends up making a distasteful film". The film bombed at the box office.

References

2005 films
2000s Tamil-language films
2005 romantic drama films
Indian romantic drama films
Films shot in Ireland